John Street (19 November 1926 – July 1988) was an English professional footballer who played as a goalkeeper.

Career
Born in Rotherham, Street played for signed for Liverpool, Sheffield Wednesday and Rotherham United.

References

1926 births
1988 deaths
English footballers
Liverpool F.C. players
Sheffield Wednesday F.C. players
Rotherham United F.C. players
English Football League players
Association football goalkeepers